The 2020 KBS Drama Awards, presented by Korean Broadcasting System (KBS), was held on 31 December 2020 at KBS Hall in Yeouido, Seoul. Considering the resurgence of COVID-19, the show was held without on-site audience. The show aired on 31 December at 20:30 (KST).

Winners and nominees

Presenters

Special performances

See also
 2020 SBS Drama Awards
 2020 MBC Drama Awards
 7th APAN Star Awards

References

External links 
  
 

Korean Broadcasting System original programming
2020 television awards
KBS Drama Awards
2020 in South Korea
2020 in South Korean television